
Year 819 (DCCCXIX) was a common year starting on Saturday (link will display the full calendar) of the Julian calendar.

Events 
 By place 

 Europe 
 Spring – Emperor Louis I marries Judith of Bavaria in Aachen. She becomes his second wife and Empress of the Franks. Like many of the royal marriages of the time, Judith is selected through a bridal show.
 Ljudevit, duke of the Slavs in Lower Pannonia, raises a rebellion against the Frankish Empire. Louis I sends an army led by Cadolah of Friuli, but is defeated by the Pannonian Slavs. 
 Battle of Kupa: Ljudevit defeats the Frankish forces led by Borna, a vassal of Louis I. He escapes with the help of his elite bodyguard. Ljudevit uses the momentum and invades the Duchy of Croatia.
 Nominoe, a noble Briton, is appointed by Louis I as count of Vannes in Brittany (approximate date).

 Abbasid Caliphate 
 August 11 – Caliph Al-Ma'mun returns to Baghdad, securing the city's place as the capital of the Abbasid Caliphate.
 Abbasid caliph Al-Ma'mun dismisses Al-Hasan ibn Sahl, as governor of al-Iraq.

Births 
 Martianus Hiberniensis, Irish monk and calligrapher (d. 875)

Deaths 
 March 8 – Li Shidao, Chinese warlord 
 Áed Oirdnide, king of Ailech (Ireland)
 Cadolah, duke of Friuli (Italy)
 Cairell mac Fiachnai, king of Ulaid (Ireland)
 Cheng Yi, chancellor of the Tang Dynasty
 Hisham ibn al-Kalbi, Muslim historian (b. 737)
 Liu Zongyuan, Chinese poet and official (b. 773)

References